Willie Raston (born 21 April 1984) is a New Zealand former professional rugby league footballer who played in the 2000s for the Canberra Raiders in the National Rugby League.

Early life
Born in Palmerston North, Raston is a nephew of New Zealand international John Lomax.

Playing career
Raston, a prop, is a former Junior Kiwis representative and played for the New Zealand Maoris in 2005. He played in the first three rounds of the 2006 NRL season for Canberra. This included two heavy losses, where Canberra conceded over 50 points and Raston lost his place in the side.

References

External links
Willie Raston at Rugby League project

1984 births
Living people
Canberra Raiders players
Junior Kiwis players
New Zealand Māori rugby league team players
New Zealand rugby league players
Rugby league players from Palmerston North
Rugby league props